Ginan may refer to:
 Ginan, Gifu, a town in Japan
 Ginan Station, a train station
 Ginan, the IAU-approved proper name of the star Epsilon Crucis
 Ginan (hymn), a type of devotional hymn of South Asia